Karelia can refer to:

Geographic region 

 Karelia, the land of Karelians, in its most general sense
 Karelian Autonomous Soviet Socialist Republic, historical Soviet Karelia region
 Republic of Karelia, an autonomous republic in Russia (Eastern Karelia)
 Karelo-Finnish SSR, a Soviet Republic (1940–1956)
 East Karelia, the cultural root of Finnishness, the land of the Kalevala
 Karelia constituency, Russian legislative constituency in the Republic of Karelia
 Finnish Karelia, a historical province of Sweden and Finland (Western Karelia)
 Ladoga Karelia (most of which was ceded in 1940)
 North Karelia, an administrative region in present-day Finland
 Central Karelia, subdivision of North Karelia 
 Pielinen Karelia, subdivision of North Karelia 
 Municipalities of North Karelia, municipalities of North Karelia grouped by sub-region
 Karelian Isthmus (most of which was ceded in 1940)
 South Karelia, an administrative region in present-day Finland
 Municipalities of South Karelia, municipalities of North Karelia grouped by sub-region
 Tver Karelia in the Tver Oblast
 Northern Karelia Province, former Finnish region
 Savolax and Karelia County, historical Swedish county

Music 
 Karelia (album), 1989 album by Shizuka Kudo
 Karelia Suite, a collection of classical music by Jean Sibelius
 The Karelia (band), a former band of Alex Kapranos
 Karelia (heavy metal band), a French heavy metal band
 Karelia, a 1989 album by Shizuka Kudo
 "Karelia", a song by Lidia Klement
 "Karelia", an instrumental piece by Amorphis on their 1992 album The Karelian Isthmus
 "Karelia", an instrumental piece by Insomnium on their 2019 album Heart Like a Grave

Business 
 Karelia Tobacco Company, a Greek tobacco company
 FC Karelia Petrozavodsk, formerly professional Russian football team
 FC Karelia-Discovery Petrozavodsk, amateur/semi-pro Russian football team
 Karelia University of Applied Sciences, Finnish University 
 Karelia Aviation Museum, Finnish museum

Military
Army of Karelia, former Finnish army
Karelia Air Command, peace-time Finnish Air Force unit
Karelia Brigade, Finnish Army readiness brigades
North Karelia Brigade, former Finnish Army unit

Other 

 Russian submarine Karelia (K-18), a submarine in service with the Russian Navy
 ProKarelia, Finnish fringe irredentist group
 Karelia Watson, software program released by Karelia Software for the Macintosh in 2001

See also 
 Karelian (disambiguation)
 Academic Karelia Society
National Theatre of Karelia